Haverthwaite is a civil parish in the South Lakeland District of Cumbria, England.  It contains ten listed buildings that are recorded in the National Heritage List for England.  Of these, one is listed at Grade II*, the middle of the three grades, and the others are at Grade II, the lowest grade.  The parish is in the Lake District National Park.  It contains the villages of Haverthwaite and Backbarrow, and is otherwise mainly rural.  A surviving building from its industrial past is a former saltpetre refinery for a gunpowder factory.  The other listed buildings include houses and associated structures, farm buildings, bridges, a war memorial, and a church.


Key

Buildings

References

Citations

Sources

Lists of listed buildings in Cumbria